Pradeep Kumara (born Jayasinghage Pradeep Kumara on 15 August 1972) was a Sri Lankan cricketer. He was a right-handed batsman and left-arm slow bowler who played for Police Sports Club. He was born in Colombo.

Kumara made a single first-class appearance for the side, during the 1998–99 season, against Burgher Recreation Club. In the only innings in which he batted, he scored 7 runs.

He made a single List A appearance, though he did not bat or bowl in the match, against Bloomfield Cricket and Athletic Club.

References

External links
Pradeep Kumara at CricketArchive 

1972 births
Living people
Sri Lankan cricketers
Sri Lanka Police Sports Club cricketers
Cricketers from Colombo